Haridaspur is a village in Jajpur district, Odisha, India.

Geography
It is located at an elevation of 122 m above MSL.

Location
National Highway 16 starts from Haridaspur. Haridaspur railway station is situated on the Cuttack-Jajpur route.

References

External links
 Satellite map of Haridaspur
 About Haridaspur Railway Station

Cities and towns in Cuttack district